"Theme from Star Wars" may refer to:

 "Star Wars Theme/Cantina Band", a 1977 hit by Meco
 "Star Wars (Main Title)", a 1977 movie theme hit by John Williams